Fairview Peak may refer to
Fairview Peak (Colorado), a high mountain summit in Colorado, U.S.
Fairview Peak (Oregon), in Lane County, Oregon, U.S. 	
Fairview Peak (Churchill County, Nevada), in the Clan Alpine Mountains
Fairview Peak (Lincoln County, Nevada), in the Fairview Range